Lieutenant General Yenduru Venkata Krishna Mohan, AVSM, SM, VSM is a retired Indian Army general who last served as the Commandant of the Defence Services Staff College. He previously served as the Commander, IX Corps of the Indian Army. He assumed the post after Lt. General Satinder Kumar Saini took over as the GOC-in-C, Southern Command.

Early life and education 
Mohan was born in Anantapur, Andhra Pradesh. He is an alumnus of Korukonda Sainik School, Andhra Pradesh; National Defence Academy, Pune; and Defence Services Staff College, Wellington. He has also attended Royal College of Defence Studies, London.

Career 
He was commissioned into 7th battalion of 11 Gorkha Rifles in 1981. He has served in various high-altitude areas like Sikkim, Ladakh and Siachen Glacier. He has commanded an infantry brigade in a high-altitude area and 17th Mountain Division (Gangtok). His staff appointments include Assistant Chief Integrated Defence Staff (Joint Operations) at HQ Integrated Defence Staff. His instructional appointments include the commandant of National Defence College, Delhi.

During his career, he has been awarded the Vishisht Seva Medal (2015), the Sena Medal during Operation Meghdoot (2005), and the Ati Vishisht Seva Medal in 2019 for his service.

Military awards and aecorations

References 

Indian generals
Indian Army officers
Commandants of National Defence College, India
Year of birth missing (living people)
Living people
Graduates of the Royal College of Defence Studies
Commandants of Defence Services Staff College